Bolsheselsky District  is an administrative and municipal district (raion), one of the seventeen in Yaroslavl Oblast, Russia. It is located in the center of the oblast. Its administrative center is the rural locality (a selo) of Bolshoye Selo. Population: 9,906 (2010 Census);  The population of Bolshoye Selo accounts for 35.6% of the district's total population.

References

Notes

Sources

Districts of Yaroslavl Oblast